Icelandic names are names used by people from Iceland. Icelandic surnames are different from most other naming systems in the modern Western world by being patronymic or occasionally matronymic: they indicate the father (or mother) of the child and not the historic family lineage. Iceland shares a common cultural heritage with the Nordic countries of Denmark, the Faroe Islands, Norway, Sweden and Finland. Unlike other Nordics, Icelanders have continued to use their traditional name system, which was formerly used by all Nordic countries. The Icelandic system is thus not based on family names (although some people do have family names and might use both systems).

Some family names do exist in Iceland, most commonly adaptations from last names Icelanders took up when living abroad, usually Denmark. Notable Icelanders who have an inherited family name include former prime minister Geir Haarde, football star Eiður Smári Guðjohnsen, entrepreneur Magnús Scheving, film director Baltasar Kormákur Samper, and actress Anita Briem. Before 1925, it was lawful to adopt new family names; one Icelander to do so was the Nobel Prize-winning author Halldór Laxness, while another author, Einar Hjörleifsson and his brothers all chose the family name "Kvaran". Since 1925, one cannot adopt a family name unless one explicitly has a legal right to do so through inheritance.

First names not previously used in Iceland must be approved by the Icelandic Naming Committee before being used. The criterion for acceptance of names is whether they can be easily incorporated into the Icelandic language. With some exceptions, they must contain only letters found in the Icelandic alphabet (including þ and ð), and it must be possible to decline the name according to the language's grammatical case system, which in practice means that a genitive form can be constructed in accordance with Icelandic rules.

Names considered to be gender nonconforming have historically not been allowed; however, in January 2013, a 15-year-old girl named Blær (a masculine noun in Icelandic) was allowed to keep this name in a court decision that overruled an initial rejection by the naming committee. Her mother Björk Eiðsdóttir did not realize at the time that Blær was considered masculine; she had read a novel by Halldór Laxness, The Fish Can Sing (1957), that had an admirable female character named Blær, meaning "light breeze", and had decided that if she had a daughter, she would name her Blær.

In 2019, the laws governing names were changed. First names are no longer restricted by gender.

Typical Icelandic naming

A man named Jón Einarsson has a son named Ólafur. Ólafur's last name will not be Einarsson like his father's; it will become Jónsson, indicating that Ólafur is the son of Jón (Jóns + son). The same practice is used for daughters. Jón Einarsson's daughter Sigríður'''s last name would not be Einarsson but Jónsdóttir. Again, the name means "Jón's daughter" (Jóns + dóttir).

In some cases, an individual's surname is derived from a parent's second given name instead of the first. For example, if Jón is the son of Hjálmar Arnar Vilhjálmsson he may either be named Jón Hjálmarsson (Jón, son of Hjálmar) or Jón Arnarsson (Jón, son of Arnar). The reason for this may be that the parent prefers to be called by the second given name instead of the first; this is fairly common. It may also be that the parent's second name seems to fit the child's first name better.

In cases where two people in the same social circle bear the same first name and the same father's name, they have traditionally been distinguished by their paternal grandfather's name (avonymic), e.g. Jón Þórsson Bjarnasonar (Jón, son of Þór, son of Bjarni) and Jón Þórsson Hallssonar (Jón, son of Þór, son of Hallur). This practice has become less common (the use of middle names having replaced it), but features conspicuously in the Icelandic sagas.

Matronymic naming as a choice
The vast majority of Icelandic last names carry the name of the father, but occasionally the mother's name is used: e.g. if the child or mother wishes to end social ties with the father. Some women use it as a social statement while others simply choose it as a matter of style.

In all of these cases, the convention is the same: Ólafur, the son of Bryndís, will have the full name of Ólafur Bryndísarson ("the son of Bryndís"). Some well-known Icelanders with matronymic names are the football player Heiðar Helguson ("Helga's son"), the novelist Guðrún Eva Mínervudóttir ("Minerva's daughter"), and the medieval poet Eilífr Goðrúnarson ("Goðrún's son").

In the Icelandic film Bjarnfreðarson the title character's name is the subject of some mockery for his having a woman's name – as Bjarnfreður's son – not his father's. In the film this is connected to the mother's radical feminism and shame over his paternity, which form part of the film's plot. Some people have both a matronymic and a patronymic: for example, Dagur Bergþóruson Eggertsson ("the son of Bergþóra and Eggert"), the mayor of Reykjavík since 2014. Another example is the girl Blær mentioned above: her full name is Blær Bjarkardóttir Rúnarsdóttir ("the daughter of Björk and Rúnar").

Gender-neutral patronymics and matronymics

A gender autonomy act approved by the Icelandic Parliament in 2019 allows individuals who register their gender as neutral (i.e., non-binary) to use bur, a poetic word for "son", to be repurposed as a neuter noun, as a suffix instead of son or dóttir.

 History 
Unlike the other Nordic countries, Iceland never formalized a system of family names. A growing number of Icelanders — primarily those who had studied abroad — began to adopt family names in the second half of the 19th century. In 1855, there were 108 family names but by 1910 there were 297. In 1913, the Althing legalized the adoption of family names. The Icelanders who had family names tended to be upper-class and serve as government officials.

In 1925, Althing banned the adoption of new family names. Some of the common arguments against the usage of family names were: they were not authentically "Icelandic"; the usage of -son in family names made it unclear if the name was actually a family name or patronymic; and there were fears that low-class people would adopt the family names of well-known upper-class families. Some of the common arguments for the usage of family names were: they made it easier to trace lineages; they made it easier to distinguish individuals (a problem in mid-19th century Iceland was that there were so many people named Jón — in fact, one in six Icelandic males were named Jón at the time); and that Iceland ought to follow the lead of its Nordic neighbours.

In Russia, where name-patronyms of similar style were historically used (such as Ivan Petrovich which means Ivan, the son of Peter), the much larger population necessitated the introduction of surnames, and relegated the patronymic to record-keeping middle-name and conversational honorific.

Cultural ramifications
In Iceland, listings such as the telephone directory are alphabetised by first name rather than surname. To reduce ambiguity, the telephone directory goes further by also listing professions.

Icelanders formally address others by their first names. By way of example, the former prime minister Jóhanna Sigurðardóttir would not be introduced as 'Ms Sigurðardóttir' but either by her first name or her full name, and usually addressed by her first name only. While the name of Icelandic singer Björk is generally perceived as her stage name, it is actually simply her first name (her full name is Björk Guðmundsdóttir). Björk is how any Icelander would address her, whether formally or casually.

In the case of two people in the same group having the same given name, perhaps one named Jón Stefánsson and the other Jón Þorláksson, one could address Jón Stefánsson as "Jón Stefáns" and Jón Þorláksson as "Jón Þorláks". When someone holds a conversation with these two people at the same time, the appendage "son" would not need to be used; in that case, the genitive form of the father's name could be used like a nickname, although it is just as common in such cases to refer to people by their middle names (having a middle name being nowadays the general rule for people with a common name like 'Jón').

As a result of the vast majority of people using patronymics, a family will normally have a variety of last names: the children of (married or unmarried) parents Jón Einarsson and Bryndís Atladóttir could be named Ólafur Jónsson and Katrín Jónsdóttir. With matronymics, the children in this example would be Ólafur Bryndísarson and Katrín Bryndísardóttir. Patronymics thus have the formula (genitive case of father's name, usually adding -s, or if the name ends in -i, it will change to -a) + son/dóttir/bur, whereas matronymics are (genitive case of mother's name, often -ar, or if the name ends in -a, it will change to -u) + son/dóttir/bur''.

Outside of Iceland
The Icelandic naming system occasionally causes problems for families travelling abroad, especially with young children, since non-Icelandic immigration staff (apart from those of other Nordic countries) are usually unfamiliar with the practice and therefore expect children to have the same last names as that of their parents.

Icelandic footballers who work abroad similarly will be referred to by their patronymics, even though such use of the term is considered improper from a native Icelandic standpoint. Aron Gunnarsson, for example, wore the name "Gunnarsson" on the back of his shirt in the Premier League before his move to Al-Arabi, and was referred to as such by the British media and commentators.

Expatriate Icelanders or people of Icelandic descent who live in foreign countries, such as the significant Icelandic community in the Canadian province of Manitoba, usually abandon the traditional Icelandic naming system. In most cases, they adapt to the naming conventions of their country of residence—most commonly by retaining the patronymic of their first ancestor to immigrate to the new country as a permanent family surname, much as other Nordic immigrants did before surnames became fully established in their own countries. Alternatively, a permanent family surname may sometimes be chosen to represent the family's geographic rather than patronymic roots; for example, Canadian musician Lindy Vopnfjörð's grandfather immigrated to Canada from the Icelandic village of Vopnafjörður.

See also

 Germanic name
 Icelandic grammar for details on how genitive works in Icelandic
 Icelandic language
 List of Icelanders
 Scandinavian family name etymology
 Naming conventions similar to Icelandic names:
Generally:
Patronymic
Matronymic
Some specific cultural examples:
 Ethiopian name
 Malay name
 Mongolian name
 Russian patronymics
 Scottish Gaelic name

Notes

References

External links
 Information on Icelandic Surnames (Ministry of the Interior)
 English translation of the Personal Names Act No. 45 of 17 May 1996 (Ministry of the Interior)

Icelandic culture
Iceland, Naming conventions of
 
Linguistic purism in Icelandic